The Chinese button knot is essentially a knife lanyard knot where the lanyard loop is shortened to a minimum, i.e. tightened to the knot itself. There emerges therefore only two lines next to each other from the knot: the beginning and the end. The knot has traditionally been used as a button on clothes in Asia,  thus the name.

Tying 
The basic chinese button knot (ABOK #599 on one string) is usually tied with a carrick bend that attaches the two ends as a first step. This results then in a knife lanyard knot  (ABOK #787) where the loop part can be sized and used as a button hole, while the knot part can be used as a button. 

Below is the ABOK description, and several video demonstration references: 

There is however a tying method that does not require a carrick bend, rather a slip knot as a first step, and does not produce a lanyard loop that needs to be reduced when used as a button. This method provides just the button, a spherical basket weave knot, in the style of Turk's head knot.

A third way to tie this knot  starts with two loops almost like tying the celtic button knot, except for the curvature change at the center which results in the way the ends exit the knot; at opposite sides for celtic, at the same side here. 

The resulting knot in both tying methods (slip-knot method and two-loops or whyknot method) is ABOK #600 which is similar to knife lanyard knot but the loop part is reduced to the top center bulge on its surface.

Which triangular hole at the S formed/back bent top center each end is tucked thru in both tying methods makes a difference:
 tucking thru the one at near side of the center as indicated by red lines in this image gives ABOK #600 the 8 part knot, of which the common chinese button knot is a version with a 9th surface part,
 tucking thru the one at opposite side as indicated by red lines in this image gives ABOK #787 the knife lanyard knot but with a retreated loop.

See also
 Tangzhuang, a jacket which often incorporates knotted buttons

References 

Decorative knots
Stopper knots